CBS Paramount may refer to the following:

CBS Paramount Television (now CBS Studios), a television production and distribution company or any of the following subdivisions:
CBS Paramount Domestic Television, formerly the main United States distribution arm
CBS Paramount International Television, formerly the main international distribution arm
CBS Paramount Network Television, formerly the main production arm

See also 
 Paramount Global (formerly ViacomCBS), the parent company of both CBS and Paramount Pictures since 2019